Sobennikoffia is a genus of flowering plants from the orchid family, Orchidaceae. It contains four known species, all endemic to Madagascar.

References

External links

Vandeae genera
Orchids of Madagascar
Angraecinae